Shanxi Coking Co., Ltd. (SCC) is a publicly traded coke manufacturing conglomerate in China. The company was listed on Shanghai Stock Exchange.

In 2015 Shanxi Coking had sold 3.25 million tons of coke, 233.9 thousand tons of methanol, 62.4 thousand tons of carbon black, 91.9 thousand tons of asphalt and 14.9 thousand tons of coking toluene. The listed company also had a massive related deal with its largest shareholder Shanxi Coking Coal Group, which purchased  of coal from the company in 2015.

History
Shanxi Coking Co., Ltd. was incorporated on 23 October 1995 as company limited by shares, as a subsidiary of Shanxi Coking Group. On 8 August 1996, the shares of the company started to float on Shanghai Stock Exchange. In 2001 the parent company merged with other companies to form Shanxi Coking Coal Group. After the deal Shanxi Coking Group owned 34.15% stake and Xishan Coal & Electricity Power owned 24.19% stake. After several capital increases, Shanxi Coking Group owned 14.22% stake and Xishan Coal & Electricity Power owned 11.50% stake only.

A backdoor listing of 49% equity stake in Huajin Energy was announced in April 2016 by issuing new shares and cash to acquire from Shanxi Coking Group. The rest of the stake was owned by another listed company (and competitor) China Coal Energy. After the deal, Shanxi Coking Coal Group would owned 47.87% stake of the listed company via wholly owned subsidiary Shanxi Coking Group and 5.27% stake via subsidiary Xishan Coal and Electricity Power.

According to China Coal Energy, Huajin Energy produced 9.95 million tonnes of coal in 2015, accounted for 10.4% total production mass of China Coal Energy.

Shareholders
As at 31 December 2015, Shanxi Coking Group owned 14.22% stake as the largest shareholder. It was followed by Xishan Coal and Electricity Power (11.50%), both subsidiary of Shanxi Coking Coal Group.

References

External links

 

Coal companies of China
Chemical companies of China
Companies owned by the provincial government of China
Chinese companies established in 1995
Energy companies established in 1995
Non-renewable resource companies established in 1995
Companies listed on the Shanghai Stock Exchange
Companies based in Shanxi